New Hope is an unincorporated community in Washington County, Florida, United States.  It is located on State Road 79.

Geography

Images

References

Unincorporated communities in Washington County, Florida
Unincorporated communities in Florida